The 34th Golden Rooster Awards honoring best Chinese language films which presented during 2020–21. The award ceremony was held in Xiamen, China, and broadcast by CCTV-6.

Winners and nominees

References 

2021
2021 film awards